Lim Fung Kee (born 22 February 1950) is a former Malaysian football goalkeeper. In 2004, he was inducted in Olympic Council of Malaysia's Hall of Fame for 1972 Summer Olympics football team.

Career
Lim played for Selangor FA in Malaysia Cup tournament in the late 60s and early 70s. He also played for the Malaysia national football team, and was in the team that qualified to the 1972 Munich Olympics football competition.
In the finals, Lim played one group games, substituting Wong Kam Fook on 27 minutes against Morocco.

Lim also played in Hong Kong for professional club Seiko SA in 1974. Later, he residing there after retiring.

Honours
Selangor
Burnley Cup: 1969
Malaysia Cup: 1971, 1972

Seiko
Hong Kong First Division League: 1974–75, 1978–79, 1980–81
Hong Kong FA Cup: 1974–75,  1975–76, 1977–78, 1979–80, 1980–81
Hong Kong Senior Challenge Shield: 1973–74, 1975–76, 1976–77, 1978–79, 1979–80, 1980–81

Malaysia
Merdeka Cup: 1974

References

External links
 

Living people
1950 births
Seiko SA players
Hong Kong First Division League players
Malaysian expatriate sportspeople in Hong Kong
Expatriate footballers in Hong Kong
Malaysian sportspeople of Chinese descent
Malaysian footballers
Malaysian expatriate footballers
Malaysia international footballers
Olympic footballers of Malaysia
Footballers at the 1972 Summer Olympics
Selangor FA players
Association football goalkeepers